Shahjahan Hawlader Sujan (died on 3 July 2001) was a Bangladesh Nationalist Party politician and a Jatiya Sangsad member from Brahmanbaria-6 constituency winning by-election in 1994 and general election in February 1996. He served as the vice president of Haji Mohammad Mohsin Hall Students Union of the University of Dhaka.

Assassination
Sujan died in a homicide - his body was found dead near the Doel Square at the University of Dhaka campus on 3 July 2001, five days after his abduction near Jonaki Cinema Hall in Dhaka. In 2003, the Criminal Investigation Department (CID) pressed charges against local BNP party member Kajol Ahmed Jalali and 11 others in the murder case. In March 2004,  Dhaka Speedy Trial Tribunal sentenced Jalali to death and four others  to life imprisonment. In March 2007, High Court overturned the lower court verdict as the state counsel failed to prove the murder charges.

References

1960s births
2001 deaths
Bangladesh Nationalist Party politicians
Assassinated Bangladeshi politicians
People murdered in Bangladesh
2001 murders in Bangladesh